was a railway station in Kamikawa, Hokkaidō Prefecture, Japan. Its station number is A42.

Lines
Hokkaido Railway Company
Sekihoku Main Line

Layout
The station has one platform with one track.

Adjacent stations

Railway stations in Hokkaido Prefecture
Railway stations in Japan opened in 1960
Railway stations closed in 2021